St. Stephen's Church is a historic church at 22-27 Oxford Street in New Hartford, Oneida County, New York. It was built in 1825 and is a rectangular timber framed Federal style structure with selected Gothic detail.  It features a central pavilion and two-stage tower composed of a square lower level and octagonal belfry with domed cap. A Gothic Revival parish house ell was attached to the main block in 1912 and subsequently enlarged in the 1950s.

It was listed on the National Register of Historic Places in 1996.

References

Churches on the National Register of Historic Places in New York (state)
Episcopal church buildings in New York (state)
Federal architecture in New York (state)
Churches completed in 1825
Churches in Oneida County, New York
19th-century Episcopal church buildings
National Register of Historic Places in Oneida County, New York